Ceroplesis arcuata is a species of beetle in the family Cerambycidae. It was described by Harold in 1879. It is known from Angola, the Democratic Republic of the Congo, and Tanzania.

References

arcuata
Beetles described in 1879